Sherkat-e Yushvand (also Romanized as Sherḵat-e Yūshvand) is a village in Ziaran Rural District, in the Central District of Abyek County, Qazvin Province, Iran. At the 2006 census, its population was 65, in 14 families.

References 

Populated places in Abyek County